"Lupin, l'incorreggibile Lupin" (Lupin, the Incorrigible Lupin) is a theme song written by Alessandra Valeri Manera and Ninni Carucci and sung by a fictional music group called "Gli Amici di Lupin" (The friends of Lupin), which is composed by Enzo Draghi (vocals) and Simone D'Andrea (Sei furbo Lupin! sentence). It is the Italian theme song of Lupin the Third anime series used from 1987. From 2004 the song is replaced by Giorgio Vanni's Hallo Lupin in the first and second anime series, whereas third anime series kept the Lupin, l'incorreggibile Lupin song.

The complete song has a length of 3 minutes and 17 seconds. During the TV broadcast, a reduced version with a length of 1 minute and 38 seconds is used.

In France and Spain the music of the song is used for Captain Tsubasa anime series (Olive et Tom in French, Campeones: Oliver y Benji in Spanish).

1987 singles
Songs from animated series
Italian-language songs
Lupin the Third